The 2011 Tour of Belgium is the 81st edition of the Tour of Belgium cycling stage race. It takes place from 25 May to 29 May 2011 in Belgium. The race is part of the UCI Europe Tour. It begins with a short prologue in Buggenhout, followed by four longer stages, ultimately finishing in Putte.

Schedule

Teams
Twenty-one teams have been invited to the 2011 Tour of Belgium: 7 teams are from the UCI ProTeams, 7 are UCI Professional Continental Teams and 7 are UCI Continental Teams.

Stages

Prologue
25 May 2011 – Buggenhout (Belgium), 

With only 7 turns in the course, the short prologue in Buggenhout was not technical and favored more powerful riders. Surprisingly, the first rider to beat his time was his young teammate Jens Debusschere, who stayed in the lead for quite a long time. Eventually Sebastian Langeveld beat the time of Debusschere and from that point on, with the winds turning, a few more riders managed to come close to the time of Langeveld. Eventually Langevelds compatriot Lieuwe Westra beat his time by a mere four seconds to take the stage win and the first black jersey. The Belgian spectators were delighted to see Tom Boonen and Philippe Gilbert riding good times, both finishing in the top 10 after a period of absence following the spring classics.

Stage 1
26 May 2011 – Lochristi (Belgium) to Knokke-Heist (Belgium), 

The stage started with one minute of silence in remembrance of Belgian cyclist Wouter Weylandt, a former stage winner during the Tour of Belgium who died two weeks earlier as a result of a crash during the 2011 Giro d'Italia.

With around 60 kilometres to go and strong winds picking up as the peloton got closer to the North Sea, the  team pulled the peloton apart by using the drafting technique, as such creating an elite group. Notable absentees in this group were leader in the race Lieuwe Westra, two time Tour of Belgium winner Stijn Devolder and classics specialist Filippo Pozzato who would finish several minutes back in one of the dropped groups. The elite group sprinted for the victory in Knokke-Heist, with André Greipel taking the stage win and due to the bonification seconds he also became the new leader.

Stage 2
27 May 2011 – Knokke-Heist (Belgium) to Ypres (Belgium), 

Just a few kilometres into the stage, five riders broke away from the peloton: Koen Barbé, Marcus Burghardt, Niko Eeckhout, Jens Mouris and Luca Paolini. The breakaway group got a lead of up to four minutes, but was caught just after the second climb of the Kemmelberg by Philippe Gilbert. Soon after, about 20 other riders also closed the gap, while Gilbert had managed to win the last intermediate sprint of the day, which gave him enough time bonus to overtake his teammate André Greipel in the standings. The lead group increased to almost 60 riders and with the finish line coming closer it was hard for anyone to get away from the pack. A late solo breakaway by Jelle Wallays was ended just 2 kilometres from the finish and the group sprinted for the stage win. In the sprint, Tom Boonen and Allan Davis came up strongly to the front but faded early, allowing Aidis Kruopis to overtake them in the final metres and book the biggest win of his young career. André Greipel lost both the black jersey for the overall lead and the yellow jersey of the points classification, respectively to Philippe Gilbert and Tom Boonen.

Stage 3
28 May 2011 – Bertem (Belgium) to Eupen (Belgium),

Stage 4
29 May 2011 – Oreye (Belgium) to Putte (Belgium),

Final standings

General classification

Points classification

Sprint classification

Young Rider classification

Team classification

Classification leadership table

References

External links
Race website

Tour of Belgium
Tour of Belgium
Tour of Belgium